Hamtaro is a series of video games based on the Hamtaro anime series.

Games

Tomodachi Daisakusen Dechu

 is a fortune-telling game released in Japan for the Game Boy Color in 2000. Though it has the appearance of a virtual pet game, the game contains no pet-raising elements nor direct ways to interact with Hamtaro. Rather, the game asks the player to fill out a notebook with information (full name, nickname, gender, birth date, and blood type) about themselves, their family, and their friends. This information is then used to pseudo-randomly generate predictions about the person – which Ham-Ham they're most like, their personality traits, their romantic or platonic compatibility with other people that have been entered, etc. – creating the appearance of fortune-telling. The game also has a real-time element, through which Hamtaro will occasionally speak to you of his own accord. Notebook entries can also be traded with other people via the Game Boy Color's infrared feature.

It was the ninth best selling game on the Game Boy Color platform in Japan, with 343,950 copies sold. It would later be the foundation for Tomodachi Collection (and, by extension, the Tomodachi series) – in a Japanese Iwata Asks interview, Ryutaro Takahashi revealed that the development of that game began with Yoshio Sakamoto stating: “I want to make a version [of Tomodachi Daisakusen Dechu] that adult women could play.” This led to the game's inception under the working title .

Ham-Hams Unite!

 is a Hamtaro adventure video game developed by Pax Softnica and published by Nintendo for the Game Boy Color handheld video game console. It was first released in Japan on April 21, 2001, and was later released in North America on October 28, 2002, and in Europe on January 10, 2003. It was the last game officially released for the Game Boy Color in Europe. It was the seventh best selling Game Boy Color game in Japan, with 497,061 copies sold.

The player (Hamtaro) is controlled by the D-pad, and holding down the B button allows the player to run. Pressing A will open a dialogue box with different Ham-chat words depending on context. For instance, standing next to a sunflower seed and selecting "hif-hif" will pick up the seed, while standing next to an NPC and selecting "Hamha" will open a dialogue with the character. Different options will yield different outcomes, rolling (Tack-Q) into NPCs will usually elicit a negative response. Objects in the world can be interacted with, like climbing trees and pulling drawers open.

The player enters the Clubhouse and is directed by the Boss to round up the other hamsters.

Ham-Ham Heartbreak

Hamtaro: Ham-Ham Heartbreak is a video game for Game Boy Advance developed by Pax Softnica and published by Nintendo, as the sequel to Tottoko Hamutaro: Tomodachi Daisakusen Dechu and Hamtaro: Ham-Hams Unite!. Therefore, it was the second Hamtaro game released in America and Europe, but the third one in Japan. It was released in Japan on May 3, 2002, in North America on April 8, 2003 and in Europe on June 27, 2003. After Hamtaro: Ham-Ham Heartbreak, only one more Hamtaro adventure game was released, which was Hamtaro: Rainbow Rescue.

Like its predecessors, Hamtaro: Ham-Ham Heartbreak is an adventure game. Set in the world of the Hamtaro books and anime, the player controls the hamster ("Ham-Ham", as the hamsters tend to call themselves) Hamtaro. The game expands on the gameplay of the earlier titles by adding Bijou, a friend of Hamtaro who has a crush on him, as partner. Together, they have to save the other ham-hams from Spat, an evil hamster with a hatred for any kind of relation.

Wake Up Snoozer!

Hamtaro: Wake Up Snoozer! is a 2003 educational game for Microsoft Windows and Mac OS. It is the only Hamtaro game to be released for PC/Macintosh.

Hamtaro and his friends play minigames to wake up Snoozer. The minigames are child-oriented. The game includes special features to work with the Ham-Hams such as: Hamtaro, Bijou, Panda, Howdy, Dexter, Pashmina, Boss, and Oxnard. And options to return to clubhouse, and more.

Rainbow Rescue

 is a video game developed by AlphaDream and published by Nintendo for the Game Boy Advance. It's the sequel to Tottoko Hamutarō: Tomodachi Daisakusen Dechu, Hamtaro: Ham-Hams Unite! and Hamtaro: Ham-Ham Heartbreak. It was released in Japan and PAL regions, and was set to be released in North America, but it was cancelled. The series is based on the manga Hamtaro, written by Ritsuko Kawai.

The game involves an extensive plot. One day while playing outside, Bijou witnesses a great rainbow. The rainbow disappears and Prince Bo falls to the ground. The Prince states that he can make rainbows by using his umbrella. He tries to prove it to disbelieving Stan and the rest of the Ham-Hams, but realizes too late that the colors on his umbrella are gone. And thus, Hamtaro and his Ham-Ham friends must set off on a journey in order to collect things that are the proper color for Prince Bo to use for his umbrella so he can create a rainbow to return home.

Certain minigames are needed to reach the colors, and the player must have certain Ham-Hams in their party in order to play them. For example, Sandy is needed to ride pigeons, Bijou is needed to collect falling petals, and Penelope is needed for rolling on top of cans to get across small streams. In addition to the original Ham-Hams, the game contains some additional characters, most of which were never seen in the English anime. These include Prince Bo, who is the prince of Rainbowland (a castle that is made of clouds); Flora, or Nurse-Ham; Tux; and other various characters.

In Japan, Famitsu gave it a score of two eights and two sevens for a total of 30 out of 40.

Hamtaro: Ham-Ham Games

 is a sports video game developed by AlphaDream and published by Nintendo for the Game Boy Advance handheld video game console. It was released in Japan on July 15, 2004, in Europe on July 16, 2004, and in North America on July 27, 2004.

The game received "generally favorable reviews" according to the review aggregation website Metacritic.  In Japan, Famitsu gave it a score of one seven, two eights, and one seven for a total of 30 out of 40.

Tottoko Hamtaro Nazo Nazo Q Kumonoue no ? Jou

 is a quiz video game released for the Nintendo DS in Japan in 2005. Eschewing an explorable world, this game consists of a large collection of quiz questions, most of which are wordplay-based riddles. A fraction of questions is dedicated to subjects such as mathematics and science, and to trivia about the Ham-Hams. Progress in the game is made by answering multiple levels of randomly selected questions in a multiple-choice format – though all but one kana of each answer is blacked out. To successfully answer these, the player is tasked with first playing a training mode which offers hints and the ability to reveal blacked-out kana, and thus learn the answer to each question in advance. During play, sunflower seeds are earned, which can be used as currency for furnishing a virtual home.

Hi Hamtaro! Ham-Ham Training

 known as Hi! Hamtaro Ham-Ham Challenge in North America, is a puzzle game for the Nintendo DS made by AlphaDream and published by Marvelous in Japan, 505 Games in PAL regions, and Natsume in North America. It is a sequel to Hamtaro: Ham-Hams Unite!, Hamtaro: Ham-Ham Heartbreak, Hamtaro: Rainbow Rescue (which was never released in America), Hamtaro: Ham-Ham Games, and the Japan-only Tottoko Hamtaro Nazonazo Q: Kumo no Ue no ?-Jō, and is based on the anime series Hamtaro. The game was released in Japan on March 15, 2007, in Europe on May 23, 2008 and in North America on September 23, 2008.

Hamtaro: Little Hamsters, Big Adventures
Hamtaro: Little Hamsters, Big Adventures was a videogame released for iOS in 2011.
It was delisted from the App Store in 2014 and is thus no longer playable.

Notes

References

 
Video game franchises
Nintendo franchises
Shogakukan franchises
Hamtaro
Nintendo games
Video game franchises introduced in 2000